Wonder Man is a Marvel comic book superhero.

Wonder Man may also refer to:
Wonder Man (DC Comics), three DC comic book characters
Wonder Man (Fox Publications), a Fox Publications superhero
The Wonder Man (film), a 1920 American film starring Georges Carpentier
Wonder Man (film), a 1945 musical with Danny Kaye
Wonderman (1979 film), a Finnish science-fiction comedy
"Wonderman" (Right Said Fred song), 1994
"Wonderman" (Tinie Tempah song), 2011
"The Wonderman", sarcastic sobriquet of the Count of St. Germain, an 18th century adventurer
"The Wonder Man", Mahomet Allum, former "Afghan" cameleer who settled in Adelaide, Australia, and became known as a herbalist

See also
Wonder Woman (disambiguation)
Wonder Girl
Wonder boy (disambiguation)
Captain Wonder